The 1995 United States federal budget is the United States federal budget to fund government operations for the fiscal year 1995, which was October 1994 – September 1995.  This budget was the last to be submitted before the Republican Revolution in the 1994 midterm elections.

Receipts

(in billions of dollars)

Outlays
The total outlays for FY1995 was 1.52 trillion dollars as authorized by congress.

Deficit/Surplus
The budget had an estimated deficit for enacted legislation of $164 billion.2.2% of GDP

References

1995
1995 in American politics
United States federal budget